Wongsak Malaipun (born 6 November 1935) is a Thai sports shooter. He competed in the men's 50 metre rifle, prone event at the 1976 Summer Olympics.

References

1935 births
Living people
Wongsak Malaipun
Wongsak Malaipun
Shooters at the 1976 Summer Olympics
Place of birth missing (living people)
Wongsak Malaipun